Nur Maznah binti Ismail (1 January 1956 – 2 November 2001), better known as Mona Fandey, was a Malaysian pop singer and murderer. She was executed on 2 November 2001 at the age of 45, after being convicted of the murder of Batu Talam state assemblyman, Mazlan Idris in 1993.

After she killed Mazlan Idris, she reportedly went on a shopping spree in Pahang right after withdrawing RM 300,000 (US$116,000 at the time) from a local bank.

Early life and career 
Maznah started singing and dancing at a very young age. Adopting her stage name Mona Fandey, she released her debut album titled Diana in 1987, with her husband Mohamad Nor Affandi Abdul Rahman endorsing and funding her career, booking several TV appearances, but her career hardly took off. Following her failure as a singer, she and Affandi turned to practicing witchcraft, and is said to have attracted high-profile clients, including politicians from UMNO.

Mona leaves behind a daughter from her first marriage named Mazdiana Affandi, with two step-sons from her marriage with Affandi.

Murder of Mazlan Idris
In 1993, the couple were approached by Mazlan Idris, a politician who was eyeing the position of the Menteri Besar of Pahang. The couple agreed by promising to give Mazlan a talisman comprising a tongkat and a songkok supposedly owned by former Indonesian president Sukarno, with an offer of RM 2.5 million. In exchange, Mazlan agreed to pay RM 500,000 and giving them 10 land titles as guarantee for the remainder. 

Mazlan was reported missing on 2 July 1993 after withdrawing RM 300,000 from a bank in Kuala Lumpur and meeting Mona at Raub, Pahang. After the murder, Mona was reported to have been on a shopping spree where she bought a Mercedes-Benz and had a facelift. It was alleged that the murder occurred between 10:00 PM and midnight on 18 July 1993 when Mona chopped his head off during a shamanistic ritual. His body was dismembered into 18 parts and buried in a hole at the storeroom of an unfinished house. On 20 July 1993, police found Mazlan's body, after arresting the couple's assistant Juraimi Hassan in an unrelated drug offence and questioning him. Mona, Affandi and Juraimi were arrested two days after the discovery of the body, and a highly publicised trial began.

Trial and execution
The trio were tried in Temerloh High Court by a 7-person jury (trial by jury was abolished from 1 January 1995). The High Court found all three of them guilty and sentenced them to death by hanging. Mona and the others filed appeals to the Federal Court and in 1999, the court dismissed their appeals and upheld the death sentence. Finally, the three convicts sought to obtain a pardon from the Pardons Board of Pahang, their final chance of redemption. However, the board refused to give clemency. The three were given a last meal of KFC on the night before their execution. Mona, Affandy and Juraimi were hanged on 2 November 2001 at Kajang Prison. A prison official said the trio expressed no remorse at the pre-dawn execution.

Throughout the trial, Mona exhibited strange behaviour including appearing cheerful, constantly smiling and posing for press photographers. She dressed extravagantly with bright and colourful designs on her dress. She also remarked, "looks like I have many fans". It was also reported that during her execution she uttered the words "aku takkan mati", meaning "I will never die", and was still calm and smiling.

Legacy
Mona Fandey gained more notoriety than she had when she was still a pop singer. There was wide local and even international media coverage and plenty of public interest. Anti-death penalty movements including Amnesty International voiced their opposition to the execution of the trio. In 2002, Malaysian film director Amir Muhammad made a short film entitled Mona in his shorts series.

In 2006, a film by Dain Iskandar Said entitled Dukun was widely assumed to be based on Mona Fandey. The public screening of this highly anticipated film was constantly pushed back, most likely due to concerns relating to the contents of the film, the relationship with Mona Fandey, and the implications for her family. However, the movie was leaked online through Facebook on early February 2018. The movie was released in cinemas on 5 April 2018.

The crime was covered in a chapter called Pop Singer Witch Doctor in the best-selling Malaysian Murders & Mysteries book written by journalists Martin Vengadesan and Andrew Sagayam.

The Mona Fandey affair was one of the last jury trials to be conducted in Malaysia. The sensational nature of the case contributed toward the government's decision to discontinue the jury system. All trials by jury were abolished on 1 January 1995.

See also
Capital punishment in Malaysia

References

Malaysian people of Malay descent
People executed for murder
1956 births
2001 deaths
Malaysian female murderers
21st-century executions by Malaysia
Executed Malaysian women
People convicted of murder by Malaysia
Malaysian people convicted of murder
Crimes involving Satanism or the occult
Asian witchcraft
People executed by Malaysia by hanging
21st-century Malaysian women
20th-century Malaysian women singers
1993 murders in Malaysia